Park Chul-woo (Hangul: 박철우; born  in Gumi, Gyeongsangbuk-do) is a South Korean male volleyball player. On club level he currently plays for the Suwon KEPCO Vixtorm.

Career

Club career
Park began his professional career out of high school in 2004 after signing a contract with the Hyundai Capital Skywalkers.

An unrestricted free agent in the 2010 offseason, Park was signed by the Samsung Fire Bluefangs on May 31.

International career
Park first garnered attention at the 2003 World Junior Volleyball Championship, where he led his team to the semifinals of the tournament as the starting opposite spiker. Next year he won the gold medal at the 2004 Asian Junior Volleyball Championship as part of the South Korean junior national team. In 2005 Park got called up to the junior national team again for the 2005 World Junior  Volleyball Championship, where his team finished in sixth place.

Park first joined the South Korean senior national team in 2006 and took part in the 2006 FIVB World League, where the team finished in tenth place. Next year Park competed at the 2007 FIVB World League, where South Korea finished ninth for its best result since 1995.

At the inaugural AVC Cup, Park played as the starting opposite spiker in all six matches and helped Team Korea to the gold medal match, where they lost to Asia No. 1 Iran in full sets. He was named the tournament's "Best Spiker".

Park was part of the South Korean  national team that won the 2014 AVC Cup when the team defeated India 3–0 in the final match.

Individual awards

Club
 2009 V-League - Most Valuable Player

National Team
 2008 AVC Cup - Best Spiker

External links
 Profile at FIVB.org

1985 births
Living people
People from Gumi, North Gyeongsang
South Korean men's volleyball players
Asian Games medalists in volleyball
Volleyball players at the 2010 Asian Games
Volleyball players at the 2014 Asian Games
Medalists at the 2010 Asian Games
Medalists at the 2014 Asian Games
Asian Games bronze medalists for South Korea
21st-century South Korean people